"Even the Man in the Moon Is Cryin'" is a song co-written and recorded by American country music artist Mark Collie.  It was released in August 1992 as the first single from the album Mark Collie.  The song reached number 5 on the U.S. Billboard Hot Country Singles & Tracks chart and peaked at number 11 on the Canadian RPM Country Tracks chart.  Collie wrote the song with Don Cook.

Content
The song is a ballad, in which the narrator explains that he is upset because his lover has left him.

Critical reception
Deborah Evans Price, of Billboard magazine gave the song a favorable review, calling it a "praiseworthy delivery of a progressively written ballad." She goes on to call it "infectious and believable."

Music video
The music video was directed by John Lloyd Miller and premiered in late 1992.

Chart performance

Year-end charts

References

1992 songs
1992 singles
Mark Collie songs
Songs written by Don Cook
Songs written by Mark Collie
Song recordings produced by Don Cook
Music videos directed by John Lloyd Miller
MCA Records singles